Chernigovka is a rural locality (a selo) in Arovsky Selsoviet, Chishminsky District, Bashkortostan, Russia. The population was 115 as of 2010. There are 14 streets.

Geography 
Chernigovka is located 21 km east of Chishmy (the district's administrative centre) by road. Bochkaryovka is the nearest rural locality.

References 

Rural localities in Chishminsky District